Aunty Lee's Delights: A Singaporean Mystery is the first detective fiction novel in the Aunty Lee Series by Ovidia Yu. It was published in September 2013 by William Morrow and Company.

Set in Singapore, the story begins when a body washes up on Sentosa's tourist beach. The novel embodies the style of a cozy murder mystery and features Aunty Lee, the "Singaporean Miss Marple", as its primary detective. The novel highlights Peranakan culture and addresses LGBT issues. Aunty Lee's Delights received positive reviews from critics.

Background

Author
The novel was written by Ovidia Yu, a Singaporean playwright and novelist. She has written several mystery books that have been published both locally and overseas. Yu has been described by theatre director K. K. Seet as "Singapore's first truly feminist writer and unabashed chronicler of all things female." The South China Morning Post characterized her work as both controversial and successful: "Her refusal to shy away from controversial issues has seen Yu, 56, become one of Singapore's most acclaimed, eclectic and internationally successful modern writers."

William Morrow and Company purchased the publishing rights to Aunty Lee's Delights in 2013.

Aunty Lee
The protagonist of Aunty Lee's Delights is Rosie Lee. Lee, or "Aunty" as she wants to be called, is an elderly Peranakan widow and amateur detective. Instead of retiring with her dead husband's wealth, she opens Aunty Lee's Delights, a cafe and catering business that serves Peranakan dishes on the resort island of Sentosa. Aunty Lee is described as open-minded, intelligent and insatiably curious. Her primary method of investigating is to question her guests over a specially cooked Peranakan dish or a tea brewed with medicinal herbs.

According to Yu, the character of Aunty Lee is based on an amalgam of an aunt and a good friend of her mother's. Both people, she says, are "lovely, lively, large ladies who are great cooks and love feeding people with food and advice."

Plot summary
The body of a woman washes up on the beach of Sentosa and Aunty Lee begins to investigate. When a guest does not show to her wine tasting and dinner party, Aunty Lee immediately suspects the missing guest to be the murdered woman. The identity of the woman is soon confirmed as an employee of Aunty Lee's stepson. Later, another body washes up on the beach of Sentosa, prompting invigorated investigation from Police Commissioner Raja and Senior Staff Sergeant Salim. With the help of Auntie Lee's keen ability to uncover evidence, they eventually find the murderer.

Themes
The story focuses more on Aunty Lee's interactions with the other characters than the actual murder investigation. Peranakan dishes are heavily featured in the novel and the reader is introduced to the importance of food in local culture. The novel also addresses the complexities that surround LGBT acceptance in Singapore.

Characters 

Rosie (Aunty Lee), an amateur sleuth
Nina Balignasy, Aunty Lee's Filipino maid
Mark Lee, Aunty Lee's stepson
Selina Lee, Aunty Lee's stepdaughter-in-law
Raja, the police commissioner
SSS Salim Mawar, Senior Staff Sergeant of the Neighborhood Police Post
Harry Sullivan, an Australian expatriate
Frank and Lucy Cunningham, an elderly Australian tourist couple
Laura Kwee, Mark and Selina's assistant
Marianne Peters, a suicidal IT Consultant, sister to Mycroft Peters and daughter to Mr. and Mrs. Peters
Carla Saito, an American visitor
Cherril Lim-Peters, a former flight attendant who is married to Mycroft Peters
Mycroft Peters, a high profile lawyer, brother to Marianne Peters and husband to Cherril Peters
Professor Reginald Peters and Anne Peters, parents of Marianne and Mycroft Peters
Joseph Cunningham and Otto, a gay couple

Critical reception
Publishers Weekly found the book "engaging" and compared it to Alexander McCall Smith's The No. 1 Ladies' Detective Agency. Kirkus Reviews described Aunty Lee's Delights as "delightfully anachronistic" and complimented the "buoyant prose and a colorful cast, led by the lovably unstoppable sleuth herself." Reviewers for the Clitheroe Advertiser and Times and the San Francisco Book Review enjoyed the book's "exotic" setting which they felt gives foreign readers the opportunity to learn about Singaporean culture. The latter gave the book four out of five stars.

References

External links
Aunty Lee's Delights at HarperCollins

2013 novels
Singaporean novels
Detective novels
Novels with gay themes
2010s LGBT novels
William Morrow and Company books
2013 LGBT-related literary works